Ministry of War of the Russian Empire, (Military Ministry) was an administrative body in the Russian Empire from 1802 to 1917.

It was established in 1802 as the Ministry of ground armed forces taking over responsibilities from the College of War during the Government reform of Alexander I. It was renamed to the Ministry of War in 1815.

Structure 
At the end of the 19th century, the Ministry of War had following structure.
 Military Council
 War Ministry Chancellery
 Grand Staff - personal matters, organization, instruction and economy of the army
 His Imperial Majesty's Retinue
 Departments:
 Commissariat Department
 Artillery Department
 Engineer (Military Technical) Department
 Military Medical Department
 Military Education Department
 Military Justice Department
 Department of Cossack Troops
 Committees
 Committee on Military Codification - legislative questions
 Committee on Military Sanitation

Buildings 

The Ministry was initially accommodated in Count Zakhar Chernyshyov's former palace on Moika River Embankment, which was bought by the State Treasury for the Military Collegium in 1795 (later it was rebuilt and transformed into the Mariinsky Palace).

In 1824, the mezzanine and the first floor of the Lobanov-Rostovsky Residence (12 Admiralteysky Avenue) were rented for the Ministry of War for 63,000 roubles a year. On 23 June 1828, the entire building was bought by the State Treasury for one million roubles, and in 1829-1830 it was renovated to meet the Ministry's needs. It housed the principal establishments of the Ministry until its dissolution in 1918. The main entrance is guarded by white marble Medici lions.

Ministers

Ministers of Land Forces
 Count Sergey Vyazmitinov 8 September 1802 – 13 January 1808
 Count Aleksey Arakcheyev 13 January 1808 – 1 January 1810
 Prince Michael Andreas Barclay de Tolly 20 January 1810 – 24 August 1812
 Prince Aleksey Gorchakov 24 August 1812 – 12 December 1815 acting

Ministers of War 
 Count Pyotr Konovnitsyn 12 December 1815 – 6 May 1819
 Baron Pyotr Meller-Zakomelskiy 6 May 1819 – 14 March 1823
 Count Aleksander Tatischev 14 March 1823 – 26 August 1827
 Prince Alexander Chernyshyov 26 August 1827 – 26 August 1852
 Prince Vasily Dolgorukov 26 August 1852 – 17 April 1856
 Nikolay Sukhozanet 17 April 1856 – 16 May 1861
 Count Dmitry Milyutin 16 May 1861 – 21 May 1881
 Pyotr Vannovsky 22 May 1881 – 1 January 1898
 Aleksey Kuropatkin 1 January 1898 – 7 February 1904
 Viktor Sakharov 11 March 1904 – 21 June 1905
 Aleksandr Roediger 21 June 1905 – 11 March 1909
 Vladimir Sukhomlinov 11 March 1909 – 13 June 1915
 Alexei Polivanov 13 June 1915 – 15 March 1916
 Dmitry Shuvayev 15 March 1916 – 3 January 1917
 Mikhail Belyaev 3 January 1917 – 28 February 1917
 Alexander Guchkov 1 March 1917 – 30 April 1917.https://en.mvd.ru › Ministry › history History 1718 - 1802 years - Ministry of Internal Affairs of the Russian ...

See also 
 List of heads of the military of Imperial Russia

References

Further reading 
 Statesman's Handbook for Russia. 1896.

External links 
 Encyclopedia of Saint Petersburg

Russia
Military of the Russian Empire
War
1802 establishments in the Russian Empire
1917 disestablishments in Russia
Ministries established in 1802